Platylobium rotundum   is a  shrub species that is endemic to Victoria, Australia. It is a member of the family Fabaceae and was formally described in 2011. The type specimen was collected from Drummond North.

References

rotundum
Fabales of Australia
Flora of Victoria (Australia)
Plants described in 2011